Zweifel's helmet skink or New Britain spiny skink (Tribolonotus annectens) is a species of lizard in the family Scincidae. The species is endemic to New Britain.

References

Tribolonotus
Endemic fauna of Papua New Guinea
Reptiles of Papua New Guinea
Reptiles described in 1966
Taxa named by Richard G. Zweifel
Skinks of New Guinea